is a Japanese cuisine restaurant in Minato, Tokyo, primarily known for serving sushi. It had three Michelin stars until it chose to stop accepting reservations from the general public.

Description
Sushi Saito, owned by chef Takashi Saito, is located at First Floor Ark Hills south Tower, 1-4-5 Roppongi, Minato-ku, Tokyo.  It moved to its current location in February 2014. The restaurant seats eight people. Because of the limited seating and popularity of the restaurant, reservations have been described as essential. In reality, it is impossible to get a reservation at Sushi Saito unless you are a regular patron or a VIP.

The prestigious publication LaListe.com ranked, in its 2023 edition, Sushi Saito as second best restaurant in the world with 99 points, tied with other European restaurants for the spot.

Reception
Kelly Wetherille for CNN Travel, described Sushi Saito as a "hidden gem". She said that "tender, flavorful seafood and perfectly seasoned rice are worth every penny". Fodor's travel guide described the food there as being "the freshest sushi available in the world". Chef Joël Robuchon, who held the most Michelin stars in the world of any chef, once described Sushi Saito as "the best sushi restaurant in the world".

The restaurant gained a third Michelin star on the 2009 list, having previously held two. Takashi Saito said he was "very happy" at the news. Former Michelin Guide directeur général Jean-Luc Naret said that he "wanted to make this place my own". In the Asia-only version of The World's 50 Best Restaurants by Restaurant magazine, Sushi Saito was ranked 39th in 2013. The restaurant was removed from the Michelin Guide  in 2019 because it is no longer open to the public.

See also
 List of sushi restaurants

References

Tourist attractions in Tokyo
Restaurants in Tokyo
Michelin Guide starred restaurants in Japan
Sushi restaurants in Japan